Hohndorf is a municipality in the district Erzgebirgskreis, in Saxony, Germany.

References 

Erzgebirgskreis